Ace High may refer to:
 Ace High (1918 film), American Western film
 Ace High (1919 film), American Western film
 Ace High (1968 film) (It: I quattro dell'Ave Maria), 1968 Italian Western film
 ACE High, NATO communications system
 Ace high straight flush, poker card game hand
 Ace High (pinball), woodrail pinball machine released by Gottlieb in 1957

See also
 Aces High (disambiguation)